"Jump" is a song by American singer Ciara, featuring American hip hop group Coast Contra. It was released on July 8, 2022, through Ciara's own label Beauty Marks Entertainment, in partnership with Uptown and Republic Records. It is a mid-tempo dance song that is expected to be included on Ciara's upcoming eighth album, her first released in partnership with Uptown and Republic Records. 

"Jump" was praised by critics for its anthemic qualities. The release was followed by an accompanying music video the same day, which received praise for its 14 outfits and looks and high octane dancing which paid tribute to previous Ciara music videos, as well as earning comparisons to Ciara's inspiration, Janet Jackson.

Background and release 
In an interview with Rated R&B in May 2022, Ciara confirmed that her eighth album was complete and its first music video has been filmed. Around the same time, Ciara announced a new record which would see her record label Beauty Marks Entertainment partner with Uptown Records and Republic Records to release her eight studio album, at the time of announcement the album title and release date had not been unveiled. Speaking of the deal to work with Uptown and Republic, Ciara said: 

Chris Malone Méndez from Forbes commented on Ciara's time in the music industry saying that during the 2000s, "Ciara's music was inescapable, reverberating from club walls and car speakers everywhere". Méndez also noted however that in the 2010s, although still popular, Ciara's "personal circumstances" were more public than her music. Following Beauty Marks, Ciara had also launched a clothing label, LITA by Ciara, as well as writing a children's novel Why Not You? with husband Russell Wilson. "Jump" is Ciara's first single in two years, following 2020 single "Rooted". Prior to this, Ciara released another standalone single "Melanin" featuring Lupita Nyong'o, La La Anthony and City Girls, as well as promoting her then-latest album Beauty Marks (2019). Describing the song, Ciara said "I'm back on my mission to make the world dance", while also confirming that it would be the first single from her then-upcoming eight album. "Jump" features upcoming American hip hop group Coast Contra and was released on July 8, 2022. The music video was released at 12pm EST.

Music and lyrics 
"Jump" is a mid-tempo dance song, described by Stereogums Rachel Brodsky as bass-heavy, stating that it "sounds ready-made for sports arenas". Ciara wrote the lyrics alongside Theron Thomas from songwriter-artist duo Rock City, while Sam Sumser and Sean Smill composed the music. All four musicians are credited with producing the song. Rachel Blum, DJ Riggins, Jaycen Joshua, Jacob Richards and Mike Seaberg were all involved in mixing the track, while Joshua and Andrew "Andy" Park engineered the song. Thomas previously collaborated with Ciara on her single 2018 single "Level Up", which was also the first single from her previous album Beauty Marks (2019). 

Lyrics include the lines "I know what you want from me / If you wanna have fun with me / Wanna be on the winning team." During promotion for the song, Ciara said "Jump" was a celebratory anthem, reflecting on her journey since her previous album Beauty Marks (2019), "it celebrates the beautiful shades of culture that comprise the inner and outer beauty of everyone. Embracing the unique nature of our skin tones threads together the tapestry of humankind." Describing the song, Ciara said "I feel like some of my best music is what I call stadium music ... It's also what I call 'Ghetto-Pop,' Its songs that can play in the hood and beyond, and that's always been important to me since day one."

Critical reception 
Writing for The Denver Post, Tiney Ricciardi called "Jump" a "booty bouncing blowout with enough jiggle and shake to carry you through to football season". Writing for Rap-Up, Devin said "Jump" was a "TikTok-ready anthem that will have you dancing all summer long." Parlemag noted that even based on social media teasers, fans called the song a bop. Meredith B. Kile from ET agreed, saying that "Jump" was a "club-ready" anthem. "Jump" was picked for inclusion on BrooklynVegans "our favorite songs of the week playlist".

Promotion 

Ciara began promoting the song with short clips via Twitter in June 2022. One such clip featured the singer twerking atop a Ford Bronco. The inclusion of a Bronco was a significant bit of cross-promotion, given that her husband, quarterback Russell Wilson, had recently moved to the Denver Broncos. The video itself garnered attention from fans for gas station where it was filmed, due to the inclusion of high gas prices. Alongside the song's release, Ciara released a media statement and made appearances on Good Morning America to promote the release. The wide-ranging interview discussed the song's meaning as well as her journey to becoming an independent artist. 

A social media post on Instagram about the song said, "I wanna see you… Jump into the new YOU. Jump into LOVE (Loving on you:)) Jump into FUN. Jump into DANCE. What you waiting for? ". Further posts leading up to the song's released included more teasers and also the song's single cover, which featured an outfit made of Air Jordan 4 sneakers. The outfit was made by Cierra Boyd, who previously made similar looks for the likes of Cardi B, Kat Graham and Kim Petras amongst others. The look from the cover art had been teased by Ciara a few days prior during a brief video on Instagram.

Music video

Background and concept 

A music video for "Jump" was directed by Dave Meyers, who Ciara previously worked with on Missy Elliott's "Lose Control" (2005) and her own "Dance Like We're Making Love" (2015). The music video premiered on July 8, 2022, at 12PM EST. Describing the moment the video premiered, Ciara said "this moment is special for so many reasons… just considering the timing of where we've all been in this world, this time of creativity for me", going on to describe dance as a universal language, and wanting to make people dance and have the best time while listening to the song. The video features no fewer than 14 outfits/looks, with Ciara stating it was the most work and effort she had put into a music video. Some of the looks drew comparisons to Janet Jackson and the video was filmed across four days. According to Vibe, the video high energy and paid tribute to a number of Ciara's own "iconic dance moves" and looks, including recreating a scene dancing atop a car from her 2010 song "Ride". The Winston-Salem State University Powerhouse Red & White cheerleading squad also feature in the music video. The group flew out to Los Angeles to film for the music video and praised Ciara and her team for how the squad were treated; each squad member was assigned a crew member to look after them on set. Speaking about how the squad became involved in the video, one of their coaches NeSheila Washington explained that one of Ciara's dancers spotted the squad on Instagram, before sending a message via the app to say "they would be a great fit for the song".

Synopsis 
The video opens with a scene of Ciara chanting the song's chorus and performing a cheer routine with the WSSU 'Powerhouse of Red and White Cheerleaders'. During this segment, the group chant: "You like it when I make that thang jump, You go Wow when I make that thing jump/ It get loud when I make that thing jump, It’s a party when I make that thing jump." Across 14 looks, Ciara dances across multiple scenes including "dancing through the roof", "moving trains" and "power lines". Following the cheer scene, the music video jumps to Ciara in red curly hair, twerking "in a parking lot full of low riders" before transitioning to a rooftop scene featuring Ciara in "an all black-ensemble in knee-high sneakers", recreating the "Ciara walk" from her "Goodies" music video (2004). The fourth scene finds Ciara dancing on an electrical wire in a set consisting of loose-fitting trousers, a white crop top, trench coat, and bucket hat, with a silver chain necklace and white sneakers. 

The next scene features Ciara as a daytime "1, 2 Step" dance instructor, shouting, "They can't jump with us, can't mess with us, drop that ass girl! Make 'em say 'wow!' Drop that ass girl, make it clap loud. Let's go!" before her and women perform aerobics to the song's chorus. In the next scene, Ciara dances at the beach in a taupe swimsuit, supported by dancers in similar attire. The next scene features Ciara dancing on top of car, which she noted as a reference to her video for "Oh" in 2005. It is followed by a scene in which "her hair turned into sparkler candles as she whipped it around in a black bikini top and latex pants."

Subsequent scenes feature Ciara dancing in the street in football uniform and then performing with Coast Contra during their verse, "surrounded by 4-wheelers". The next scene features Ciara and dancers in an alley while objects float around them. The video concludes with Ciara in a Canadian tuxedo-inspired outfit, dancing atop a freight train.

Reception
Amber Corrine from Vibe praised the music video for being a visual experience and event, "'Jump' brings us back to the days when music videos actually felt like an experience. From a 14-outfit wardrobe change to epic scenery, choreographed dance routines, coupled with captivating graphic effects." Fellow artist, British singer Sam Smith gave the song a positive review having watched the video upon its release; Smith said "I just saw the 'JUMP' video. I’m trying not to swear right now. [Laughs] Unbelievable! Unbelievable. Amazing. [Points to fans] You are going to die! Insane, insane! Ugh!".

Credits and personnel

Song credits 
Adapted from Tidal.

Rachel Blum – assistant audio mixer
Ciara – lead vocals, producer
Coast Contra – featured vocals
DJ Riggins – assistant audio mixer
Jaycen Joshua – engineer, mixer
Andrew "Andy" Park – engineer
Jacob Richards – assistant audio mixer
Mike Seaberg – additional audio mixer
Sam Small – producer, programmer
Sam Sumser – producer, programmer
Theron Thomas – producer, programmer

Music video credits 
Adapted from YouTube.

Nathan Adams – tailor
Tevin Allen – assistant coach (WSSU)
Stephen Bielecki – producer
Monika Breg – producer
Oth'than Burnside – stylist (for Coast Contra, and hip-hop segment)
Storm Debarge – freestyle dancer
Bianca Delone Brewton – dancer
Lindsay Ducos – dancer
Kollin Carter – lead wardrobe stylist
Ciara – creative direction, editor
Scott Cunningham – director of photography
Jamaica Craft – creative direction, lead choreographer
Stephanie Desiree – tailor
Yolanda Frederick-Thompson – make-up artist (for Ciara)
Saya Fukushi – manicurist assistant
Anthony Gilbert – dancer
Brianna Gret – freestyle dancer
Marc Inniss – dancer
Lord Fin – freestyle dancer
Jeff Malen – sound mixer
Kyvon McFashion – stylist assistant (for Coast Contra and hip-hop segment)
Dave Meyers – director
Franceleslia Millien – wardrobe assistant
Mod Creations – post-production effects
Erina Nogushi – manicurist assistant 
Rafael Nsar – make-up assistant
Miho Okawara – manicurist (for Ciara)
Tom Paolantonio – sound mixer
Ahsia Pettigrew – dancer
Cesar Deleon Ramirez – hairstylist (for Ciara)
Trinity Ringer – dancer
Tacir Robertson – dancer
Candace Savage – dancer
Nathan Scherrer – executive producer
Arthur Pa'yton Silver – club cardio
Zeandre Simpson – wardrobe assistant 
Josh Smith – choreographer, dancer
Stefan Sonnenfeld – colorist
Jai Shukla – editor
Kenny Taylor – 1st assistant director
Taylor Terry – choreographer, dancer
Les Umberger – VFX supervisor
Destiny Vaughn – choreographer, dancer
Alaini Walker – dancer
Nesheila Washington – head cheer coach (Powerhouse of Red & White WSSU)
Terry Watson – set design
Todd Williamson – choreographer
Winston-Salem State University (WSSU) – powerhouse cheerleaders
Airi Yamada – manicurist assistant
Morgan Yamamoto – stylist assistant (for Coast Contra and hip-hop segment)

Charts

Release history

References 

2022 songs
Ciara songs
Coast Contra songs
Dance music songs
Uptown Records singles
Republic Records singles
Beauty Marks Entertainment singles
Songs written by Ciara
Songs written by Sam Sumser
Songs written by Sean Small
Songs written by Theron Thomas
Song recordings produced by Ciara
Song recordings produced by Sam Sumser
Song recordings produced by Sean Small
Song recordings produced by Theron Thomas
Music videos directed by Dave Meyers (director)